The Louisville, Henderson, and St. Louis Railroad Depot in Fordsville, Kentucky was built in 1916. It was listed on the National Register of Historic Places in 1991.

It "is a long, low, concrete-block, tile-roofed building which relates most closely in style to the Prairie School."

References

National Register of Historic Places in Ohio County, Kentucky
Prairie School architecture in Kentucky
Railway stations in the United States opened in 1916
Railway stations on the National Register of Historic Places in Kentucky
Fordsville
Former railway stations in Kentucky
Transportation in Ohio County, Kentucky
1916 establishments in Kentucky